is a Japanese multimedia project co-developed by ASCII Media Works' Dengeki G's Magazine, music label Lantis, and animation studio Sunrise. The project is the second series of the Love Live! franchise and is a spin-off sequel of Love Live! School Idol Project. The story of this project revolves around a new group of nine schoolgirls who become idols in order to save their school from shutting down. It launched in April 2015 with music CDs and anime music videos, followed by a manga version in 2016.

An anime television series was directed by Kazuo Sakai at Sunrise; the first season aired between July and September 2016 while the second season aired between October and December 2017. Both seasons are licensed in North America, the United Kingdom, Australia and New Zealand by Funimation, Anime Limited and Madman Entertainment, respectively. An anime film titled Love Live! Sunshine!! The School Idol Movie: Over the Rainbow was released on January 4, 2019 in Japanese theaters.

An anime spin-off television series titled Genjitsu no Yohane: Sunshine in the Mirror is set to premiere in July 2023.

Plot
Love Live! Sunshine!! is set in Uchiura, Numazu, Shizuoka where one of its schools, the seaside Uranohoshi Girls' Academy, is planned to be shut down and merged with another school in Numazu. Chika Takami, a girl who lacks desires, is inspired by μ's (pronounced "muse") to gather friends and form her own school idol group called . To prevent their school from shutting down, Aqours enters the Love Live school idol contest which has become more competitive since μ's won.

Characters
Where appropriate, plot descriptions mentioned below refer to the anime television series. Other parts of the franchise, such as the manga and novel series, feature some variations in the storyline.

Aqours

Chika is a second-year student at Uranohoshi Girls' Academy. Always claiming herself to be too ordinary, she finds that the girls of μ's manage to "shine" brightly despite being normal students. This leads her to form a school idol group, with her determination compounded by the fact that her school is facing the crisis of education reform (consolidation with another school, with Uranohoshi's students moving to the other campus). The youngest among three daughters, her family runs a traditional inn known for its open-air hot springs with an ocean view. Sometimes Chika loves to insert terrible puns between her words, even explaining them. She acts as Aqours' leader and primary lyricist.

Riko is a kind, polite, modest and down-to-earth second-year transfer student from Akihabara's Otonokizaka Girls' Academy. She is a talented young pianist, but felt that she had stopped improving, and moved to Numazu to take inspiration from the sea. She is also a capable violist. She has a fear of dogs, which is not helped by the fact that the Takami family's dog, Shiitake, seems to take an interest in her. She eventually gets over her fear of dogs to the point that she now loves them, and adopts her own puppy by the end of the series. She is also revealed to have an interest in various shōjo and yuri manga, often buying collections on her brief returns to Tokyo. After joining Aqours, she becomes the composer of the group.

A third-year student and Chika's childhood friend. Kanan lives alone with her grandfather on a nearby island where they run a diving gear shop. She is introduced as having taken a leave of absence from school, as she must take care of the shop alone while her father recovers from a fractured bone. She, Dia, and Mari are childhood friends who formed a school idol group in their first year named Aqours, but disbanded quickly, leading the three to separate. Kanan is responsible for their first disbandment, feigning stage fright to treat Mari's sprained leg and to convince her to pursue her studies abroad, all of which were kept secret by her and Dia. Kanan is the most athletic member of the group and acts as their main choreographer. She has a kind, supportive and selfless personality, and is also very mature and level-headed. 

The prideful, third-year student council president of Uranohoshi Girls' Academy. She and her younger sister Ruby are part of a well-known and respected family. Dia also is a diehard fan of μ's and after she, Kanan, and Mari separated, she had been hiding her enthusiasm about school idols until she is convinced to join Aqours by Chika and the others. She is the origin of Aqours' name, passing it on to Chika's group from when she, Kanan, and Mari were school idols. She scolds and corrects the other members with her catchphrase , the Japanese onomatopoeia for an incorrect buzzer.

You is an energetic second-year student with a positive outlook. You is Chika's childhood friend and also aims to one day become a ship captain, just like her father. She loves uniforms, whether they are idol costumes or work-related uniforms like police or shrine maiden outfits. Due to this, she is the main costume coordinator of the group.

Yoshiko is a first-year student who tries to erase her chūnibyō and attend high school like a normal student. The reason why she became a chūnibyō is because she feels like she is too ordinary, as her Yohane identity makes up her entire personality. After joining Aqours, she decides to keep her chūnibyō antics instead.

Hanamaru is an easily distracted first-year student whose family runs a local temple without several modern-age utilities such as computers and hand dryers. Because of this, she becomes enamored upon seeing them, much to the surprise of others. She refers to herself as either "ora" or "Maru", and ends many of her sentences with "-zura" because of her Shizuoka dialect. She is also a member of a local choir due to her talent at singing. Before joining Aqours, she is an avid reader at the school's library. She and Yoshiko were friends during kindergarten, and Yoshiko calls her "Zuramaru."

Mari is a third-year student at Uranohoshi. Her Italian-American father runs a hotel chain and in Japan, she lives in one of their hotels. Mari is a bright person who prefers to take action by herself, and does not feel herself to be suited to become a school idol. Her favorite music genre is industrial metal. Due to her background, Mari speaks in an English accent and often mixes English and Japanese (Italian in the English dub) in her speech. Mari's family is one of the main sponsors of Uranohoshi, to the point of having her appointed as the school's chairman despite being one of the students. She was friends with Dia and Kanan, having even formed their own idol unit in the past that was disbanded some time later due to Kanan and Dia wanting her to pursue the scholarship she got at a school overseas.

Ruby is a first-year Uranohoshi student as well as Dia's timid younger sister, who has long since dreamed of becoming an idol. She has androphobia (a fear of men), as she has never talked to anyone male outside of her own father. In the anime, her shyness is increased so she enters in panic when she is touched by anyone she is not used to regardless of sex, being only comfortable around Dia and Hanamaru at the start of the anime.

Saint Snow
An idol unit from Hakodate, Hokkaido, which serves as Aqours' rival. Despite being rivals, they are on friendly terms with Aqours.

One of the members of the idol duo Saint Snow, a rival of Aqours.

Sarah's sister and partner in Saint Snow. She and her sister were inspired by A-Rise to become school idols in a similar fashion that the members of Aqours are inspired by μ's.

Others
 

Chika's eldest sister and the eldest of the Takami family.

 

Chika's older sister and the middle child of Takami family.

Media

Print
A manga titled Love Live! Sunshine!!, written by Sakurako Kimino and illustrated by Masaru Oda, began serialization in the May 2016 issue of Dengeki G's Magazine. The first tankōbon volume was released on September 27, 2016; three volumes have been released as of March 27, 2018. The manga is published in English in Malaysia by Kadokawa Gempak Starz.

A 160-page fanbook of Aqours, titled Love Live! Sunshine!! First Fan Book, was released on June 30, 2016. The book was published by ASCII Media Works and contains an introduction of Aqours' members, original manga written by Sakurako Kimino, and a newly drawn cover by Yuhei Murota.

Anime

A 13-episode anime television series produced by Sunrise, directed by Kazuo Sakai, and written by Jukki Hanada aired between July 2 and September 24, 2016 and was simulcast by Crunchyroll. The series is licensed in North America by Funimation, in the United Kingdom by Anime Limited, and in Australia by Madman Entertainment. An English dub by Funimation began streaming from July 30, 2016. Every week while the anime was airing, Bandai Visual released merchandise called "memorial items" inspired by an item in each episode only available for a limited time. A second season aired between October 7 and December 30, 2017. "Aozora Jumping Heart" is used as the opening theme for the final episode. The second season was 2018's best-selling animated series on DVD and Blu-ray in Japan, with 330,102 sales. An anime film titled Love Live! Sunshine!! The School Idol Movie: Over the Rainbow was released on January 4, 2019 in Japan. An English dub of the film was released on February 25, 2020. The main staff and cast return to reprise their roles for the film.

An anime fantasy spin-off television series titled Yohane of the Parhelion: Sunshine in the Mirror (Genjitsu no Yohane) was announced on June 26, 2022. Originally a set of fantasy illustrations appearing in Love Live! Days and featuring Yoshiko as the main character as name suggests, an anime adaptation was previously announced as an April Fool's 2022 joke before it became official in June. The series is produced by Bandai Namco Filmworks and directed by Asami Nakatani and written by Toshiya Ono, with Yumiko Yamamoto designing the characters, and Tatsuya Katō returning to compose the music. It is set to premiere in July 2023 on Tokyo MX and BS11.

Video games
In January 2016, Love Live! Sunshine!! live streamed a special announcement regarding Aqours joining the Love Live! School Idol Festival rhythm game app starting in July 2016. In the game, the Aqours idols get their own stories, new songs, and cards. KLab also added R rarity cards for each Aqours members, even though they were only voiced after July. In June 2016, Chika and Riko were featured in the in-game regular events for the first time. A spin-off game which includes Aqours, Love Live! School Idol Festival All Stars, released in September 2019.

In 2017, Hanamaru Kunikida succeeded Rin Hoshizora as the face of Puyo Puyo. Along with μ's, Aqours appears in a game based on the "nesoberi" stuffed dolls sold resembling the characters called Puchiguru Love Live!. It was released on April 24, 2018 for Android and iOS, and was shut down on May 31, 2019.

Between August 9–21, 2018, all of the members of Aqours appeared in the mobile RPG Granblue Fantasy as a collaboration event titled . The characters are divided into three teams based on their school year. Second-year students (Chika, Riko, You) are obtainable through the event story, while first-years (Hanamaru, Yoshiko, Ruby) and third-year students (Dia, Kanan, Mari) are obtainable by trading material obtainable in-game.

Music

The nine idols of Aqours are grouped into three subunits: CYaRon! (You, Ruby and Chika), Azalea (stylized in all-caps; Dia, Kanan and Hanamaru), and Guilty Kiss (Yoshiko, Riko and Mari). Five of Aqours' singles include an anime music video, while another features a live action music video starring the nine voice actresses of the characters.

Reception
Nick Creamer from Anime News Network reviewed the first season in 2018. He was critical of the overall plot reusing story elements from the original series but said it was utilized very well in making its "genuinely imperfect" main cast relatable and having a more "emotionally resonant" adventure than its predecessor. Creamer wrote that director Kazuo Sakai did an admirable job maintaining the series' visual comedy previously helmed by Takahiko Kyōgoku, giving each character a distinct and expressive trait from one another and improved the CG dance models and scenes to be more eye-pleasing and presentable than before, concluding that: "Simultaneously too similar and extremely different, suffering many of the same failings but rising to its own dramatic heights, Sunshine is ultimately a rewarding show and a fine followup for the Love Live! franchise."

References

External links
 
Official worldwide website

2016 anime television series debuts
2023 anime television series debuts
Animated musical groups
Anime spin-offs
ASCII Media Works manga
Crunchyroll anime
Dengeki G's Magazine
Japanese idols in anime and manga
Japanese musical groups
Lantis (company)
Love Live!
Madman Entertainment anime
Music in anime and manga
School life in anime and manga
Seinen manga
Sunrise (company)
Tokyo MX original programming
Upcoming anime television series